"Glass Bead" is the debut single by South Korean girl group GFriend. It was released by Source Music on January 15, 2015, as the title track for their debut extended play, Season of Glass (2015).

The song peaked at number 25 on the Gaon Digital Chart and has sold over 1,025,731 downloads, as of July 2016.

Composition 
The song was written and produced by Iggy and Youngbae.

Reception 
It was described by Fuse as a "nostalgic gem that heavily recalls Girls' Generation's earliest work, from the sound to the energetic choreography".

Music video 
A music video for the song was released on January 15, 2015.

Chart performance 
The song debuted at number 89 on the Gaon Digital Chart, on the chart issue dated January 11–17, 2015, with 17,730 downloads sold. In its second week, the song peaked at number 25.

In the monthly chart, the song debuted at number 78 for January 2015, with 75,229 downloads sold. In February, the song rose to number 43, with 81,131 downloads sold. In March, the song peaked at number 39 with 121,825 downloads sold.

The song made the year-end chart, as the 95th best selling song of 2015, with 681,925 downloads sold and 29,715,429 streams.

Charts

References 

2015 songs
2015 debut singles
GFriend songs
Korean-language songs
Hybe Corporation singles